Pseudolaelaps is a genus of mites in the family Laelapidae.

Species
 Pseudolaelaps doderoi (Berlese, 1910)     
 Pseudolaelaps gamaselloides Berlese, 1920     
 Pseudolaelaps paulseni (Berlese, 1910)

References

Laelapidae